Paramavaishnavi Goswamini Devi or Tribhuvana Mahadevi I (Odia: ପ୍ରଥମ ତ୍ରିଭୁବନ ମହାଦେବୀ) was the first female ruler of the Bhaumakara Dynasty in ancient Odisha and the widow of king Santikara I who ascended the throne of Toshali or Utkala between the years 843 A.D to 845 A.D and ruled until 850 A.D after the premature death of her ruling son Subhakara III. Some historians believe that she might have ruled as long as 863 A.D abdicating the throne for her grandson Santikara II after he turned older and eligible to run the administration. She was a very powerful female ruler and found appreciating mentions as a beholder of lavish power and prestige by the Arab and Persian geographer Ibn Khordadbeh and explorer Ahmad Ibn Rustah. She rose to power despite feudal kings of coastal-central parts of erstwhile Tri-Kalinga region rebellions and with the help her powerful father. She compared herself with the Goddess Katyayani (a form of Goddess Shakti) when she ascended the throne at Guheswarapataka mentioned in her Dhenkanal charter. She is also credited for the construction of the Baitala Deula which is one of the oldest surviving temple structures standing erect to this day in old Bhubaneswar and one of the few in Odisha built in Khakara style temple architecture.

Origin and Personality of the Queen 

The origin of Tribhuvana Mahadevi I as a royalty is still disputable among historians as it is believed by some that she was the daughter the king Rajamalla I of Mysore while other historians rest their theory that she was the daughter of a king from the early Eastern Gangas from the southern neighbor of the Bhaumakara kingdom. The Dhenkanal charter of queen herself gives an indication about how the Eastern Gangas of Kalinga were first defeated by the earlier Bhaumakara king Sivakara I and then restored to power after they accepted his suzerainty, establishing relationship of good faith between the two royal families which could have ended up in matrimonial alliances. Her descendant Sivakara III mentions in his inscriptions that Tribhuvana mahadevi I was filled with three energies Mantra Shakti (the power of divine chants), Prabhu Shakti (Spiritualism) and Utsaha Shakti (energetic). She was described as a Pitrabhakta (devout child to her parents) meditating at the feet of her parents. Her Dhenkanal charter has associated full imperial epithets to her and describes that as a person she was adorned with hundreds of auspicious signs to be a superior ruler in the world. She was a devout Vaishnavite who worshiped Hari and took the epithet as Paramavaishnavi.

Ascension to the Throne 
The Dhenkanal charter issued by Tribhuvana mahadevi I describes her ascension as " her lotus-like feet being softly kissed by the crowns and headpieces of the great vassal and feudal kings, bowing down in devoted loyalty before her and the foot-stool of her late husband became radiant with the splendor of the diamonds in those diadems of the subjugated kings". In the preceding years before the ascension of her husband Santikara I, the Pala dynasty king Devapala had defeated the reigning king Sivakara II and subjugated the Bhaumakara rulers in Odisha. The dynasty had lost its prestige and power after this defeat which was followed by disorder in the kingdom. The subsequent deaths of Santikara I and Subhakara III as the male eligible heirs, gave rise to rebellion by feudal kings. The inscriptions of later Bhaumakara kings states that the widowed queen took upon the burden of administration of the entire kingdom and shone like Sesha, holding up the entire earth on her hood. The queen herself has credited her father to have come to rescue of the Bhaumakara rule suppressing the rebellions and helping her restore authority and order in the kingdom.

Administration of the Kingdom 
According to the charters issued by her and her descendants she is credited to have ensured an effective administration of the kingdom and prosperity of the people. Talcher plate of Subhakara IV states that during her rule the country advanced in administration, enemies were destroyed, the glory of the kingdom spread abroad and the people lived in harmony. She paid special attention in appointment of responsible and honest royal officials and the vassals of the kingdom stayed loyal to her supremacy. She exerted Mrudukara (light taxation) on her people. Her Dhenkanal charter talks about how Bhaumas exhausted treasures of their vast empire on religious works in order to enlighten their own country and others, and decorated the earth by constructing in unbroken continuity, various mathas, monasteries and temples.

During her rule and as evident from her grants and charter issued during her rule, she patronized Vaishnavism, Shaivism and Shaktism while the existence of the Jain and Buddhist ideologies in the kingdom remained uninfluenced by any kind of threat.  Women in the kingdom were educated and able exert special powers and administrative rights for issuing land grants and charters. She was able to suppress internal rebellions and expel the enemy forces of the Rashtrakutas and Palas with the help of her father securing the kingdom from any external threats.  She commanded a standing army of 3,00,000 men and women were also believed to have indulged in military affairs. She restored stability to the kingdom after a long era of chaos and disorder initiating a golden era of stability, economic prosperity and cultural growth. She served as an example for a line of another six descendant female rulers who ruled in the Bhaumakara kingdom in their own rights despite the availability of heirs and two of which even adopted her royal epithet as Tribhuvana Mahadevi.

References 

History of Odisha
History of India by region
Queens regnant in Asia
9th-century women rulers
9th-century Indian monarchs
9th-century Indian women
9th-century Indian people
Indian female royalty
Indian queens